EPH or Eph may refer to:

Science and technology
 Ephedrine
 Ephrin receptor
 Extractable petroleum hydrocarbons
Environmental Public Health

Transportation
 Elephant & Castle railway station, in London
 Ephrata station, in Ephrata, Washington, United States
 Ephrata Municipal Airport,  Washington, United States

Other uses
 Eph (album), by British post-rock band Fridge
 Energetický a průmyslový holding, a Czech energy company
 Epistle to the Ephesians, a book of the Christian Bible
 Europapress Holding, now Hanza Media, a Croatian media company
 Williams Ephs, the athletic teams at Williams College